Through the Years: The Best of the Fray is a compilation album by American rock band the Fray. The album consists of nine songs from the band's previous albums, and three new songs.

This was the Fray's final release with Isaac Slade before he left the band in 2022.

Track listing

Charts

Certifications

References

2016 greatest hits albums
Albums produced by Brendan O'Brien (record producer)
Albums produced by Ryan Tedder
Albums produced by Stuart Price
Epic Records compilation albums
The Fray albums